The Binghamton Whalers were an ice hockey team in the American Hockey League, playing in Binghamton, New York, USA, at the Broome County Veterans Memorial Arena.

History
The Whalers were generally a successful team, making the playoffs seven times and advancing all the way to the Calder Cup Finals in 1982. However, in 1989-90, they turned in a ghastly 11-60-9 record, dead last in the league.  The .194 winning percentage was the worst in AHL history at the time.  After that season, the franchise was sold to the New York Rangers and their parent, Paramount Communications (formerly Gulf+Western). The Whalers moved their affiliation to Springfield the next season, where the seven remaining players from the disastrous 1990 Binghamton season helped the Indians to their seventh and final Calder Cup championship.

The market was previously served by:
 Broome Dusters of the NAHL (1973–1977)
The market was subsequently home to:
 Binghamton Rangers of the AHL (1990–1997)
 B.C. Icemen of the UHL (1997–2002)
 Binghamton Senators of the AHL (2002–2017)
 Binghamton Devils of the AHL (2017–2021)

Team identity
The Binghamton Whalers' logo was simply the Hartford Whalers' logo turned onto its side. The curvature along the inside of the "W" was altered to more closely resemble the letter B, for the team's home city.

During home games, the song "Brass Bonanza" would play when the Whalers scored a goal, a practice adopted from the Hartford Whalers.

Season-by-season results

Regular season

Playoffs

Team records

Single season
Goals: 53 Paul Fenton  (1985–86)
Assists: 84 Ross Yates  (1982–83)
Points: 130 Paul Gardner  (1984–85)
Penalty minutes: 360 Jim Thomson  (1986–87)
GAA: 2.92 Peter Sidorkiewicz  (1986–87)
SV%: .901 Peter Sidorkiewicz  (1984–85)

Career
Career goals: 120 Paul Fenton 
Career assists: 181 Ross Yates 
Career points: 283 Ross Yates 
Career penalty minutes: 723 Shane Churla 
Career goaltending wins: 94 Peter Sidorkiewicz 
Career shutouts: 9 Peter Sidorkiewicz 
Career games: 273 Dallas Gaume

External links
 binghamtonhockey.net - Hockey history of the Binghamton, New York region
 The Internet Hockey Database - Binghamton Whalers

 
Ice hockey teams in New York (state)
Ice hockey clubs established in 1980
Ice hockey clubs disestablished in 1990
1980 establishments in New York (state)
1990 disestablishments in New York (state)
Hartford Whalers minor league affiliates